The Asia Society Hong Kong Centre is one of the global centers of the New York City based Asia Society. Located in Admiralty, in the business district of Hong Kong, it was dedicated on February 9, 2012.

The centre is situated on the site of a former British military explosives magazine and includes several restored military buildings The project was designed by architects Tod Williams and Billie Tsien.

Former explosives magazine
The Former Explosives Magazine was built between 1843 and 1874 and served as a storehouse of explosives for the British Army of the Victoria Barracks. The buildings of the complex were separated by earth mounds, known as traverses, which were built as buffers in case of explosions.

The historic buildings, which include the former Magazine A, Magazine B and the Laboratory are collectively listed as a Grade I historic building, while the former Block GG is listed as a Grade II historic building.

References

Further reading

External links

 Official website
 Entry on ArchDaily
 Antiquities Advisory Board. Pictures of the Former Explosives Magazine of the Old Victoria Barracks
 Antiquities Advisory Board. Historic Building Appraisal. Block GG of the Old Victoria Barracks Pictures

Grade I historic buildings in Hong Kong
Grade II historic buildings in Hong Kong
Admiralty, Hong Kong
Military of Hong Kong under British rule